Cyrille Thomas Makanaky (born 28 June 1965) is a Cameroonian retired footballer who played as an attacking midfielder.

Club career
Makanaky was born in Douala. After impressing at amateur level in France, with FC Saint-Leu and Gazélec Ajaccio, he represented, with little impact but always in Ligue 1, SC Toulon (twice) and RC Lens.

In 1990, Makanaky moved to Spain and remained in the country for three years, playing in Segunda División for CD Málaga and Villarreal CF. His second year, whilst at the Andalusians, finished in relegation, and the club folded soon afterwards.

Until his retirement at the age of 32, Makanaky also played in Israel with Maccabi Tel Aviv FC, Ecuador for Barcelona Sporting Club – two spells, winning the national league on both occasions – and France with former side Gazélec.

International career
Makanaky appeared in two Africa Cup of Nations with the Cameroon national team. In the 1988 edition, held in Morocco, he scored the game's only goal, helping defeat the hosts in the semifinals and eventually winning the trophy.

Makanaky also represented the nation at the 1990 FIFA World Cup in Italy, playing all five matches (two complete) as the Lions Indomptables reached the quarterfinals.

In popular culture
"Makanaki" is a nickname coined from Makanaky's name and was commonly used in some Yoruba speaking parts of western Nigeria after the exploits of the Cameroun National Team in the FIFA 1990 World Cup. The ruggedness and flamboyance of Makanaky led to the use of the Nigerianized version of the name to be used to refer to a skillful and rugged person.

External links
Racing Lens archives 

1965 births
Living people
Footballers from Douala
Cameroonian footballers
Association football midfielders
Ligue 1 players
Ligue 2 players
Gazélec Ajaccio players
SC Toulon players
RC Lens players
Segunda División players
CD Málaga footballers
Villarreal CF players
Israeli Premier League players
Maccabi Tel Aviv F.C. players
Ecuadorian Serie A players
Barcelona S.C. footballers
Cameroon international footballers
1990 FIFA World Cup players
1988 African Cup of Nations players
1990 African Cup of Nations players
1992 African Cup of Nations players
Africa Cup of Nations-winning players
Cameroonian expatriate footballers
Expatriate footballers in France
Expatriate footballers in Spain
Expatriate footballers in Israel
Expatriate footballers in Ecuador
Cameroonian expatriate sportspeople in France
Cameroonian expatriate sportspeople in Spain
Cameroonian expatriate sportspeople in Israel
Cameroonian expatriate sportspeople in Ecuador